Rescue You is the first solo album of Joe Lynn Turner, formerly of Rainbow and Fandango. This album is a collection of AOR and radio-friendly pop tracks from the rock heyday of the mid-80's. It was produced by Roy Thomas Baker.

There was a single and video release of the song, "Endlessly." The song received extensive airplay on radio and peaked at No. 19 on Billboard’s Mainstream Rock chart. The accompanying video was directed by Jim Yukich, whose credits included Iron Maiden, Genesis, and Jeff Beck. The director described the video “like a dream in the life," combining conceptual and performance footage, and revolves around the marketing of a rock star." It was filmed at Carthay Studios and the Electrasound Warehouse near Los Angeles. Tammara Wells produced. The album debuted on the Billboard 200 Album chart, the week ending November 2, 1985, and was on the charts for a total of 12 weeks, peaking at No. 143.

Track listing
Songs written by Greenwood/Turner except noted
"Losing You" - 4:25
"Young Hearts" - 3:52
"Prelude" (Newman, Turner) - 0:56
"Endlessly" - 3:40
"Rescue You" - 4:31
"Feel the Fire" - 3:28
"Get Tough" (Delia, Turner) - 4:33
"Eyes of Love" (Turner) - 3:49
"On the Run" - 3:53
"Soul Searcher" (Greenwood, Newman, Turner) - 4:08
"The Race Is On" - 3:23

Personnel
Joe Lynn Turner – vocals
Alan Greenwood – keyboards
Chuck Burgi – drums
Bobby Messano – guitar, bass guitar, backing vocals

Chart performance

References

1985 debut albums
Joe Lynn Turner albums
Albums produced by Roy Thomas Baker
Elektra Records albums